is a wetlands located near Tateyama in Toyama Prefecture, in Japan. the remaining 80,000 ha of wetlands have been designated a Ramsar Site in 2012.

Midagahara is a one of many highlights of Tateyama Kurobe Alpine Route.

Geography 

Midagahara is 2km of Horizontal length and 4km of vertical length.

Midagahara is a lava plateau formed by Tateyama volcano.

Biota 
There are Dactylorhiza aristata, Paris japonica, Lysichiton camtschatcensis, Daylily.

Facility 
There are some Hotels.

Access 
There are Midagahara bus stops between Bijodaira Station and Murodō Station on Tateyama Kurobe Alpine Route. 

Private cars aren't allowed to pass in Midagahara to protect the environment.

See Also
List of volcanoes in Japan
List of lakes in Japan

References

External links 
Tateyama kurobe Geopark

See also 
Mount Tate
Chūbu-Sangaku National Park
Tateyama Kurobe Alpine Route

Wetlands of Japan
Ramsar sites in Japan
Landforms of Toyama Prefecture
Tateyama, Toyama
Chūbu-Sangaku National Park
Tateyama Kurobe Alpine Route